Kal Dasht-e Taraqi (also Romanized as Kāl Dasht-e Taraqī; also known as Kāl Dasht-e Pā’īn and Gol Dasht) is a village in Tarrud Rural District, in the Central District of Damavand County, Tehran Province, Iran. At the 2006 census, its population was 22, in 7 families.

References 

Populated places in Damavand County